Wendell Gilbert Rayburn (May 20, 1929 – December 27, 2016) was an American educator, academic administrator, and university president. He served as president of Savannah State College from 1980 and until 1988, and president of Lincoln University from 1988 until 1996.

Career
He attended Eastern Michigan University and graduated with a B.A. degree (1951).

From 1954 until 1968, Rayburn worked in public schools in Detroit, as both an educator and as an academic administrator. From 1968 until 1972, he worked as the assistant director of special projects at Detroit University (now University Liggett School). 

Rayburn was the eighth president of Savannah State College. His administration implemented the Desegregation Plan mandated by the Georgia Board of Regents and he led the institution through the first major building program since the 1970s. Buildings on the current campus completed during his term include the marine biology complex, the Jordan College of Business Administration, the president’s house (later named William E. Gardner Hall), and the Harris-McDew Health Services Center.

Rayburn resigned in 1988 to become president of Lincoln University in Jefferson City, Missouri.

References

Further reading
Hall, Clyde W (1991). One Hundred Years of Educating at Savannah State College, 1890–1990. East Peoria, Ill.: Versa Press.

Presidents of Savannah State University
2016 deaths
African-American educators
1929 births
Presidents of Lincoln University (Missouri)
20th-century African-American people
21st-century African-American people